Simon Ip Sik-on,   (born 10 September 1948) was the member of the Legislative Council of Hong Kong (1991—1995) for the Legal functional constituency.

Ip adopted a conservative interpretation of the Basic Law and acknowledged the Chinese overlordship of the Hong Kong judiciary.

References 

1948 births
Living people
Solicitors of Hong Kong
Hong Kong Anglicans
HK LegCo Members 1991–1995
Recipients of the Gold Bauhinia Star
Commanders of the Order of the British Empire